The Barani Institute of Sciences, or BIS is a private institute having its campuses in Sahiwal and Burewala in Punjab, Pakistan. It is affiliated with Pir Mehr Ali Shah Arid Agriculture University, Rawalpindi.

History 
Barani Institute of Sciences was established in 2014, having campuses in Sahiwal and Burewala.

Affiliation 
Both Sahiwal and Burewala campuses are affiliated with the Pir Mehr Ali Shah Arid Agriculture University, Rawalpindi.

Pir Mehr Ali Shah Arid Agriculture University, Rawalpindi 

It is located in Rawalpindi almost in the center of twin cosmopolitan cities of Rawalpindi & Islamabad, the capital of Pakistan. Upon the successful completion  of their studies, students are awarded with the degrees by Pir Mehr Ali Shah Arid Agriculture University, Rawalpindi.

Barani Foundation 
The Board of Governors (BoG) of the Barani Foundation has constituted an executive committee to make and implement policies concerning academic, financial and operational matters.

Reports from the executive committee would be presented at the BoG meetings of the Barani Foundation bi-annually. The executive committee is the highest executive body of the institute, while all other committees and boards serve as advisory bodies to it.

Executive Committee – BIS Sahiwal Campus

Academic programs 
Following academic programs are offered at Barani Institute of Sciences:

Management sciences 
 Bachelor of Business Administration

Social sciences 
 Bachelor of Science in economics
 Master of Sciences in economics

Computer sciences 
 Bachelor of Science in computer science
 Bachelor of Science in information technology
 Master of Computer Science
 Master of Science in information technology

Other 
 Master of Science in statistics
 Master of Science in mathematics

References

Universities and colleges in Punjab, Pakistan
Universities and colleges in Sahiwal District
2014 establishments in Pakistan
Educational institutions established in 2014